The Broward County Library is a public library system in Broward County, Florida, in the United States. The system contains 38 branch locations and circulates over 10.5 million items annually. The system includes the Main Library in Fort Lauderdale, five regional libraries, and various branches.

History

From 1963 to 1972, activists established a library subcommittee to improve library service in Broward County. The report generated by the committee received wide media attention and was supported by County Commissioner Robert Hubener. On January 9, 1973, the Broward County Commission approved the establishment of a library system.

The system began issuing borrower cards on June 17, 1974, for 270,000 items. There were four branches: Fort Lauderdale, Riverland, Mizell, and Hollywood. Over the following three decades, many of the municipalities in Broward County elected to join the library system. These included Coral Springs, Lauderhill, Hallandale, Dania Beach, Margate, Sunrise, Deerfield Beach, North Lauderdale, and Pompano Beach.

Starting in 1978, library director Cecil Beach oversaw the planning and construction of the system's flagship branch, the Main Library. In 1980, the construction of the Main Library was funded. The cost of the Main Library went up from $20.5 to $42 million, in part because of inflation. Library-system director Cecil Beach was involved in all phases of the Main Library project, from planning to completion. In 1984, the Main Library opened.

In 1983, the South Regional Library located on the South Campus of Broward Community College became the first joint-use public-college library in the State of Florida.

The library system was named "Library of the Year" in 1996 by Library Journal and Gale Research.

Ongoing construction, including that funded by a 1999 bond issue, has resulted in the current total of 38 branch libraries in addition to the eight-story Main Library in downtown Fort Lauderdale. The Main Library also houses the Florida Center for the Book, the Bienes Museum of the Modern Book, and a public fine-arts exhibition center.

Kelvin Watson was appointed as library-system director in 2017. Upon his resignation Allison Grubbs was named Director in 2021.

African-American Research Library and Cultural Center

On October 26, 2002, the Broward County Library opened the African-American Research Library and Cultural Center, located at 2650 Sistrunk Boulevard in Fort Lauderdale, Florida. The 60,000 square-foot facility has a 300-seat auditorium, a 5,000-square-foot art gallery, and Small Business Resource Center. Since its opening, the Center has hosted more than 38 major exhibits and served more than 895,000 customers.

Broward County Historical Archives 
The Broward County Historical Archives has been a part of the Broward County Library since 2011 and contains over 800 archival collections and more than 120,000 cataloged items. Research appointments are held in the Bienes Museum of the Modern Book Reading Room​ on the 6th floor of the Main Library, and the Archive's mission is to preserve materials and objects that document the history of Broward County, Florida, and to make these records available to the public. 

The archives include:

 Personal papers, manuscripts, and photographs from local families and individuals.
 Broward County government records and papers dating back to 1915.
 Local organizations' records, such as clubs, churches, and businesses. These include employee payroll records for the Florida East Coast Railway, dating from 1918 to 1950.
 Extensive quantity of newspaper photographs from the Hollywood Sun-Tattler and Boca News from the 1970s and 1980s.
 Over 300 original oral history interviews from several oral history collections.
 A variety of objects and artifacts illustrate the uniqueness and diversity of Broward County’s history.
 Archeological material gathered from scientific excavations.
 Historical Library of rare books about local history and historical serials.

References

External links
 

County library systems in Florida
Library
Public libraries in Florida
1974 establishments in Florida